In Ancient Rome, a camp crown ("crown of the castrum"), also known as a vallary crown, was a military award given to the first man who penetrated into an enemy camp or field during combat. It took the form of a gold crown surmounted with replicas of the stakes of a palisade (a high fence consisting of pointed stakes).

In the heraldry of a few units in modern armies, a camp crown is mounted as a crest on top of the shield of the coat of arms or emblem.

The Palisado crown, a variant used in English heraldry, is defined by palisades affixed to the outside of the rim.

Gallery

See also

Celestial crown
Civic Crown
Grass crown
Mural crown
Naval crown
Heraldry
Laurel wreath

References
 Camp Crown definition. Libro de Armoría.
Fox-Davies, Arthur Charles (1909) A Complete Guide to Heraldry, Chapter XXIII: Crest, Coronets and Chapeaux.

Camp
Military awards and decorations of ancient Rome
Crowns in heraldry
Military heraldry